Crime Scene: The Vanishing at the Cecil Hotel is the first season of the Crime Scene docuseries. Released in 2021 and directed by Joe Berlinger, it chronicles the death of Elisa Lam at the Cecil Hotel. It features Viveca Chow, Judy Ho and Artemis Snow and premiered on February 10, 2021 on Netflix.

Interviewed 
 Viveca Chow
 Kim Cooper
 Josh Dean
 Judy Ho
 Greg Kading
 Santiago Lopez
 John Lordan
 John Sobhani 
 Tim Marcia
 Doug Mungin
 Amy Price
 Artemis Snow
 Jason Tovar
 Morbid Blackstar (Pablo Vergara)
 Jim McSorley

Episodes

Release
Crime Scene: The Vanishing at the Cecil Hotel was released on February 10, 2021, on Netflix.

Reception
On review aggregator Rotten Tomatoes, the series holds an approval rating of 54% based on 26 critic reviews, with an average rating of 5.30/10. The website's critics consensus reads, "A sad story poorly told, Vanishing at the Cecil Hotel buries the heart of its tragic case under unsavory conspiracy theories and tasteless reenactments." On Metacritic, it has a weighted average score of 53 out of 100, based on nine critics, indicating "mixed or average reviews".

Questions 
Writing for Insider, Libby Torres pointed out seven questions that the documentary left after claiming that the mystery was solved. Among them, the fact that it was not identified who edited the video of Elisa in the elevator (which has signs of tampering); the police went with sniffer dogs to the place where Elisa's body was, but they didn't find it; the hotel did nothing after receiving the information that Elisa was exhibiting strange behavior: "In the show, the hotel's former manager, Amy Price, explains that bizarre behavior was par for the course at the hotel, which has housed drug addicts, mentally ill people, and sex workers throughout the years. Price essentially tells producers that while Lam's behavior was odd, it didn't merit any special attention. As a viewer, though, it's hard not to wonder why the hotel didn't do more to help and whether or not assisting Lam could have prevented her death."

References

External links
 
 

2021 American television series debuts
2021 American television series endings
2021 American television seasons
2020s American documentary television series
Documentary television series about crime in the United States
English-language Netflix original programming
Netflix original documentary television series
Television series based on actual events
Television series by Imagine Entertainment
Television series set in hotels
Television series created by Joe Berlinger